Zhou Xiaozhou, may refer to:

Zhou Xiaozhou (politician)

Zhou Xiaozhou (general)